The 2018 International Friendship Championship was a friendly football tournament for the national teams of Iraq, Syria and Qatar. It took place during the March 2018 window of the FIFA International Match Calendar, and began less than a week after FIFA lifted the ban on competitive games being played inside Iraq.

The tournament was originally scheduled to take place in Karbala but was relocated to Basra. Qatar won the title by beating hosts Iraq and drawing with runners-up Syria. The last game of the tournament saw Noor Sabri make his 100th and last appearance for Iraq.

Results

References 

International association football competitions hosted by Iraq
International men's association football invitational tournaments
2017–18 in Iraqi football
Sport in Basra
2018 in Asian football
March 2018 sports events in Iraq